Sweet Smell of Success may refer to:

 Sweet Smell of Success, a 1957 film noir drama
 Sweet Smell of Success (soundtrack), the score of the 1957 film, composed by Elmer Bernstein and Chico Hamilton
 Sweet Smell of Success (song), a 2001 song by American rock band Tomahawk
 Sweet Smell of Success (musical), a 2002 musical based on the 1957 film
 Sweet Smell of Success – Best of the Epic Years, a 2003 compilation album by English rock band the Stranglers

Disambiguation pages